Ian Hutchinson may refer to:

Ian Hutchinson (cricketer) (born 1964), Welsh cricketer
Ian Hutchinson (footballer, born 1948) (1948–2002), English football player with Chelsea
Ian Hutchinson (footballer, born 1972), English football player and manager
Ian Hutchinson (motorcyclist) (born 1979), English motorcycle road racer
Ian Hutchinson (scientist), American physicist